Pablo Felipe Teixeira (born 23 June 1992), simply known as Pablo, is a Brazilian professional footballer who plays for Athletico Paranaense. Mainly a forward, he also can play as a winger.

Career

Athletico Paranaense
Born in Cambé, Paraná, Pablo finished his graduation with Atlético Paranaense's youth setup, as a right defender. On 31 August 2011 he made his first-team debut, starting in a 0–1 home loss against Atlético Mineiro.

In May 2013, Pablo was loaned to Figueirense, in Série B. He appeared in 25 matches during the campaign, scoring eight goals.

On 8 January 2014 Pablo joined Real Madrid Castilla, in a six-month loan deal. He made his Segunda División debut three days later, playing the last 21 minutes of a 2–2 home draw against Real Murcia.

São Paulo
On 18 December 2018, Pablo moved to São Paulo on a contract running until the end of 2022. São Paulo paid €5.8 million (around R$25.8 million) to Athletico Paranaense.

Return to Athletico Paranaense
On 1 February 2022, Pablo agrees to comeback to Athletico Paranaense on a free transfer after the termination of his contract with São Paulo.

Career statistics

Honours

Club
Atlético Paranaense
Campeonato Paranaense: 2016
Copa Sudamericana: 2018

São Paulo
Campeonato Paulista: 2021

Individual
Copa Sudamericana Top goalscorer: 2018

References

External links

1992 births
Living people
Brazilian footballers
Association football wingers
Association football forwards
Campeonato Brasileiro Série A players
Campeonato Brasileiro Série B players
Segunda División players
J2 League players
Brazilian expatriate footballers
Brazilian expatriate sportspeople in Spain
Brazilian expatriate sportspeople in Japan
Expatriate footballers in Spain
Expatriate footballers in Japan
Club Athletico Paranaense players
Figueirense FC players
Real Madrid Castilla footballers
Cerezo Osaka players
São Paulo FC players